"Das kleine Krokodil", also known under the title "Schnappi", is the debut single of animated cartoon crocodile Schnappi from his first album, Schnappi und Seine Freunde. The voice of Schnappi is provided by Joy Gruttmann, a child singer. Joy's aunt, Iris Gruttmann, originally wrote the song in 1999 without the "Schni-Schna-Schnappi, Schnappi Schnappi schnapp" refrain, but when the song was uploaded to the internet, this hook was added in without the Gruttmanns' or Universal Music Group's knowledge. The song quickly became a viral hit, and it was released as a single on 6 December 2004—Joy's ninth birthday.

"Schnappi" subsequently became a success in several continental European countries, topping the singles charts of Austria, Flanders, Germany, the Netherlands, Norway, Sweden, and Switzerland; it ended 2005 as Europe's sixth-best-selling single. It also became a top-10 hit in Australia and New Zealand. In 2005, the song won an ECHO Award for Download of the Year. The song has spawned a number of cover versions in different languages that also became chart hits.

Background
German child singer Joy Gruttmann provides the vocals on "Schnappi". Her aunt, Iris Gruttmann, composed the music in 1999 and rewrote the lyrics that her coworker provided. Joy, four years old at the time, was asked to sing the track. After it was recorded, it was included on a 2001 nursery rhyme sampler titled Iris Lieder – Lied für mich, without the signature "Schni-Schna-Schnappi, Schnappi Schnappi schnapp" hook. Several years later, in 2004, the song was featured on a compilation album for popular German children's series Die Sendung mit der Maus, sung by an animated crocodile called "Schnappi", who had never been featured on the programme before. Attention toward the song grew, and it was eventually illegally uploaded to the internet, unknown to the Gruttmanns or Universal Music Group at the time, with the aforementioned hook added in. Around this time, the song received its first airplay exposure when a radio station in Cologne, Germany, added the track to its playlists.

The Gruttmanns were on a family holiday during these events, and after returning home in August 2004, the editorial team for Die Sendung mit der Maus told them of the news. Upon checking the internet, they noticed the song being discussed on many message boards, discovered various remixes of "Schnappi" ranging from heavy metal to techno, and saw a video for Wacken Open Air in which rock fans were singing the track. Soon, the managing director of Bavaria Media, Rolf Moser, decided to handle the recording's licensing and promotional agreements, and it was officially released as a single in Germany on Joy's ninth birthday, 6 December 2004. At this point, Iris hired more employees and began to work on the Schnappi und Seine Freunde album.

Commercial performance
"Schnappi" reached number one on Germany's GfK Entertainment Chart on 3 January 2005, staying at the top for 10 weeks; this gave Joy Gruttmann the distinction of being the youngest musical artist to top the German Single Chart. In 2005, the single was awarded an ECHO Award for Download of the Year. The song was then released worldwide and peaked at number one in Austria, Belgium, the Netherlands, Norway, Sweden, and Switzerland in early 2005. It additionally reached number two in Denmark and number 10 in France.

In April 2005, the song began to experience success in Australasia. It made its first chart appearance on New Zealand's RIANZ Singles Chart at number 32 on 25 April. The next week, it jumped to number three before reaching number two for the first time on its third week in. Between 9 May and 18 July, the single fluctuated around the top 10, eventually spending five non-consecutive weeks at number two. It remained in the top 10 until 12 September. On 17 July, the song debuted at number 20 on Australia's ARIA Singles Chart, reaching a peak of number six on 21 August.

Cover versions
The song was re-recorded in Dutch by Snappie under the title "Snappie de kleine krokodil", which peaked at number two in the Netherlands and number five in the Flanders region of Belgium. Belgian techno group Dynamite released a cover version that charted at number three in Flanders while the original version was still topping the chart. In Walloon Belgium, the song was covered in French by Charlotte under the title "Schnappi, le petit crocodile", and peaked at number 23.

Track listings

German maxi-CD single
 "Das kleine Krokodil" (original mix) — 2:09
 "Das kleine Krokodil" (Kroko Italo mix) — 3:30
 "Das kleine Krokodil" (Nil Party mix) — 3:30
 "Das kleine Krokodil" (Kairo Pop mix) — 3:30
 "Das kleine Krokodil" (Kleiner Schnapper mix) — 2:30
 "Das kleine Krokodil" (original Schnappi Beat mix) — 2:09
 "Das kleine Krokodil" (Santa Schnappi X-mas mix) — 2:31
 "Das kleine Krokodil" (original Schnappi Karaoke mix) — 2:09

German 3-inch CD single
 "Das kleine Krokodil" (original mix) — 2:09
 "Das kleine Krokodil" (Nil Party mix) — 3:30

European CD single
 "Das kleine Krokodil" (original Schnappi mix) — 2:09
 "Das kleine Krokodil" (Kroko Italo mix) — 3:30

European DVD single
 "Das kleine Krokodil" (original video)
 "Das kleine Krokodil" (Kairo Pop video)
 "Das kleine Krokodil" (karaoke video)

Australian CD single
 "Das kleine Krokodil" (original mix) — 2:09
 "Das kleine Krokodil" (Kroko Italo mix) — 3:30
 "Das kleine Krokodil" (Nil Party mix) — 3:30
 "Das kleine Krokodil" (Kairo Pop mix) — 3:30
 "Das kleine Krokodil" (Kleiner Schnapper mix) — 2:30
 "Das kleine Krokodil" (original Schnappi Beat mix) — 2:09
 "Das kleine Krokodil" (Santa Schnappi X-mas mix) — 2:31
 "Das kleine Krokodil" (original Schnappi Karaoke mix) — 2:09
 "Das kleine Krokodil" (original mix video)
 "Das kleine Krokodil" (Kairo Pop video)

Personnel
 Arranged by Iris Gruttmann, Jochen Wagner
 Composed by Iris Gruttmann
 Lyrics by Iris Gruttmann, Rosita Blissenbach
 Producer by Daniel Scholz, Robert Wässer, Kay Wittgenstein
 Vocals by Joy Gruttmann

Charts

Weekly charts

Year-end charts

Decade-end charts

Certifications and sales

Release history

References

1999 songs
2004 debut singles
2005 singles
Dutch Top 40 number-one singles
German-language songs
Internet memes
Novelty songs
Number-one singles in Austria
Number-one singles in Germany
Number-one singles in Norway
Number-one singles in Sweden
Number-one singles in Switzerland
Polydor Records singles
Schnappi songs
Songs about fictional male characters
Songs about reptiles
Ultratop 50 Singles (Flanders) number-one singles
Universal Records singles